Kåre Bremer (born 17 January 1948) is a Swedish botanist and academic.  He has also been Vice-Chancellor of Stockholm University.

Career
Professor Bremer received his doctorate in Botany from Stockholm University in 1976, where he worked as lecturer and research assistant in the department from 1972–1975, and full-time from 1976. In 1979 he was appointed Docent. In 1980 he became Curator at the Museum of Natural History in Stockholm in the Department of Spermatophyte Botany. From 1985–1986 he was also a Research Associate and BA Krukoff Curator of African Botany at the Missouri Botanical Garden.

Following this Bremer was installed as Professor of Systematic Botany at Uppsala University in 1989, where he also became head of the department from 1992 to 1999, and Dean of Biology from 1993–1999. From 2001–2004 he was Secretary for Science and Technology Studies at the Swedish Research Council.  In January 2004 he left the University of Uppsala to take up a position as Rector (Vice-Chancellor) at Stockholm University on 1 February that year. He is currently professor of Systematic Botany at that university.

Personal life
He is married to his colleague, Birgitta Bremer, and they have two children.

Achievements
Professor Bremer is a board member of the Swedish Association of Universities and Institutes of Higher Education (Sveriges universitets- och högskoleförbund, SUHF) and is a member of the Royal Swedish Academy of Sciences (Kungliga Vetenskapsakademien, KVA). He has been a member of the Linnean Society of London since 1998. In 2006 he received the King's Medal (Hans Majestät Konungens medalj), twelfth level with the Royal Order of the Seraphim (Kungliga Serafimerorden).

The work of the Bremers at Uppsala University became the basis for the modern system of plant taxonomy, known as the Angiosperm Phylogeny Group (APG) formed by them and other international flowering plant systematists.  The system was published in 1998 largely based on the work of Bremer et al. at Uppsala University, and was available on the internet in 1996.

Species 
Two African species have been named after him, Athanasia bremeri and Pseudoblepharispermum bremeri.

References

Sources
 Personal website: Kåre Bremer
 Website: Birgitta Bremer
 Harvard Botanist Index

Botanists with author abbreviations
Swedish botanists
1948 births
Living people
Academic staff of Stockholm University
Academic staff of Uppsala University
Rectors of Stockholm University
Members of the Royal Swedish Academy of Sciences
Members of the Royal Society of Sciences in Uppsala